Anatoly Mishnev(born 24 September 1957) is a Russian politician, an oligarch. He was a member of the Federation Council from 2012 to 2015, and he served as a chairman of Smolensk Duma from 2006 to 2012. Mishnev was considered to be one of the richest residents of the Smolensk region. In 2017, Anatoly Mishnev was accused of corruption offences. In 2018, he pleaded guilty.

Biography
Anatoly Ivanovich Misnev was born 24 September 1957 in Agaponovo. He was graduated from Velikie Luki Agricultural Institute in 1979. After the institute Misnev had worked as agronomist-seed farmer at a collective farm. He was a deputy of Smolensk Duma from 1997 to 2012. In 2006 Anatoly Mishnev was appointed a chairman of Smolensk Duma. From November 2012 to October 2015 Mishnev was a member of the Federal Council, an upper house of Russian parliament. And now this politician is a head of Smolstat.

References

1957 births
Living people
Russian politicians
Members of the Federation Council of Russia (after 2000)